Tamerlan Shadukayev (born 22 January 1996) is a Kazakh Greco-Roman wrestler. He won the gold medal in the 77 kg event at the 2020 Asian Wrestling Championships held in New Delhi, India.

Career 

He won one of the bronze medals in the 75 kg event at the 2017 Asian Indoor and Martial Arts Games held in Ashgabat, Turkmenistan.

In 2019, he won one of the bronze medals in the 77 kg event at the Asian Wrestling Championships held in Xi'an, China. At the 2019 World U23 Wrestling Championship held in Budapest, Hungary, he also won one of the bronze medals in the 77 kg event.

In 2021, he won one of the bronze medals in the 77 kg event at the Matteo Pellicone Ranking Series 2021 held in Rome, Italy.

He competed in the 77kg event at the 2022 World Wrestling Championships held in Belgrade, Serbia.

Achievements

References

External links 
 

Living people
1996 births
Place of birth missing (living people)
Kazakhstani male sport wrestlers
Asian Wrestling Championships medalists
21st-century Kazakhstani people